Guy Oscar Penwell was the head basketball coach at the University of Wisconsin–Milwaukee from 1930 to 1942 and again from 1946 to 1952.  He previously served as an assistant basketball coach at the University of Minnesota under Dave MacMillan.

Head coaching record

References

Year of birth missing
Year of death missing
American men's basketball coaches
Milwaukee Panthers athletic directors
Milwaukee Panthers men's basketball coaches
Minnesota Golden Gophers men's basketball coaches